The Family Drive-In Theatre is an outdoor cinema located at 5890 Valley Pike (U.S. 11) one mile south of Stephens City, Virginia. The family-owned business opened in 1956 and is one of the state's few remaining drive-in theaters.

History
The Family Drive-In was built by William F. Dalke Jr. and opened on June 14, 1956.  It was one of eight drive-in theaters within a  radius at the time of its construction.  The number of drive-in theaters in the United States peaked at around 4,000 in 1958 while in 2013, an estimated 360 still remained.  Dalke Jr. had previously owned indoor theaters until opening Family Drive-In.  He was able to keep the theater open with the assistance of his four sons, including Tim Dalke, who took over managing Family Drive-In when he returned from fighting in the Vietnam War.

Since 2009, manager James Kopp, a self-professed "drive-in nut" and former Library of Congress employee, has leased Family Drive-In from Tim Dalke.  Kopp sits on the board of the United Drive-in Theatre Owners Association.  He works with a booking agent to get bargains on popular films.  Second-run films were previously shown on both screens because they were cheaper to rent, but Family Drive-In now shows first-run movies in order to compete with standard theaters.  Additional changes made by Kopp included hiring additional staff, expanding the theater's presence on social media, extending the operating season, and allowing customers to pay with credit cards.  According to Kopp, he doesn't make a salary while the payroll for his staff is approximately $72,000 annually.  He also states the theater's gross revenue was $459,000 for the 2012 season.

Since film companies no longer offer many titles on 35 mm film, independent theaters like Family Drive-In face expensive upgrades to continue playing new digital films.  Customers and the surrounding community donated $21,000 to help the theater, allowing Kopp to make a down payment to purchase new equipment.  The two new Christie projectors cost around $120,000.  The brightness and clarity from the new projectors allow customers to see details in films that weren't previously visible.  Following the conversion, Family Drive-In was featured in a story by NBC Nightly News dealing with drive-ins having to choose between old and new ways of showing films.  On Labor Day weekend in 2013, the theater began playing digitally projected movies in a special dusk until dawn event.  The event was organized to thank patrons for their donations in purchasing the new equipment.

Family Drive-In also hosts special events like Civil War film nights, an annual Halloween Costume Party and Trunk-or-Treat, and a car show featuring classic vehicles and 1950s themed movies.  The theater is one of nine drive-ins left in Virginia.  The closest competitor is Hull’s Drive-In Theatre in Lexington.  Family Drive-In frequently sells-out and has to turn away many people.  Customers sometimes arrive hours before showtime in order to find a good parking spot.

Features

Family Drive-In is open seven days a week from June to August, on the weekends in the spring and fall, and closed during the winter months. The  theater includes two screens playing first-run films, though older movies are sometimes played on one of the screens. The first screen is able to accommodate 240 cars while the smaller second screen, added in 1989, can accommodate 144. The double feature policy allows customers to pay one admission price and watch two-first run films. Retro music is played before the films begin and a playground is available for children. According to Kopp, the speakers and poles are difficult to maintain since only one manufacturer still makes spare parts for them. When asked if he would ever remove them, Kopp said "Heck no. These classic speakers are part of the drive-in theater experience." A concession stand staffed by "cast members" sells various refreshments, including pizza from a local restaurant and GoPicnic, a healthier option requested by some customers.

See also
 List of drive-in theaters

References

External links

 
 "Night lives: Jim Kopp, drive-in operator", video by The Washington Post
 "A night at the drive-in", photo gallery by The Washington Post
 "The Family Drive-In", video by NewsChannel 8
 "Local Drive-In Adapting To Digital Era", video by TV3 Winchester
 "The American drive-in fights for survival", video report by NBC News featuring Family Drive-In

1956 establishments in Virginia
Buildings and structures in Frederick County, Virginia
Cinemas and movie theaters in Virginia
Drive-in theaters in the United States
Stephens City, Virginia
Theatres completed in 1956